The Pont-Saint-Martin is a Roman bridge in the Aosta Valley in Italy dating to the 1st century BC.

The span is  according to recent research, but frequently stated to be 35.64 m or 36.65 m.

Other extant Roman bridges in the Aosta valley include the Pont d'Aël in the Cogne Valley and the Pont de Pierre in Aosta.

See also 
 List of Roman bridges
 Roman architecture
 Roman engineering

References

Sources

External links 

 
 Traianus – Technical investigation of Roman public works

Roman bridges in Italy
Roman segmental arch bridges
Deck arch bridges
Stone bridges in Italy
Bridges completed in the 1st century BC
Bridges in Aosta Valley
Pont-Saint-Martin, Aosta Valley